Ignacio "Nacho" Figueras Bermejo (born March 4, 1977) is an Argentine polo player and model with a 6-goal handicap. Dubbed the "David Beckham of polo", Figueras is considered to be the most famous polo player in the world. He currently co-owns and plays for Black Watch Polo Team. Since 2005, Figueras has been the face of Ralph Lauren's Black Label. In 2015, models.com ranked him in the top eighteen of their Money Men.

Early life
Ignacio Figueras Bermejo was born on March 4, 1977, in Veinticinco de Mayo, Buenos Aires. He was raised in a middle-class family on a small farm outside the city. His father was close friends with polo player Lucas Monteverde. Figueras began playing polo at age 9 with Monteverde during weekend visits to his estate. At the age of 14, he moved into Monteverde's estate so he could ride horses daily and take polo more seriously.

Polo
Figueras began playing polo professionally in Paris at age 17. "I was my own groom," Figueras spoke of the experience, "I would take care of the horses and then go play in the matches. It was a low-budget gig." He played at various locations in Europe before arriving in Bridgehampton, New York in 1999. There, he joined White Birch, a team shared at the time by Peter Brant and Neil Hirsch.  He currently plays for and is captain of BlackWatch, a team he co-owns with Hirsch.

Modeling
When he was approached by the photographer Bruce Weber 12 years ago, at a dinner party held by Kelly Klein, ex-wife of Calvin, in The Hamptons, he hoped modelling might help him buy more squirrelly mounts. "Then I realised that I could make extra money, and raise awareness of the sport." Nacho started modelling for Ralph Lauren in 2000, eventually become the face of Ralph Lauren Black Label in 2005, and has been under contract since. In May 2009, he was made the face of the World of Polo fragrances, including Polo Black, Polo Blue and Polo Modern Reserve. Black Watch is also a label under the Ralph Lauren umbrella, offering tight polo shirts emblazoned with Nacho's number 2, an idea of Figueras' to make it a billion-dollar brand. In June 2009, he was voted the second most handsome man in the world by the readers of Vanity Fair magazine with 15% of the vote, far behind Robert Pattinson, who drew 51%, and ahead of Brad Pitt, who drew 12%. Despite his success in the modeling arena, polo continues to be his passion.  He says his mission in life "is to bring polo to the world a little more," doing his best to raise the profile to the sport of polo however he can.  To that end, he has helped organize matches such as the Veuve Clicquot Manhattan Polo Classic exhibition in Governor's Island, New York; the most recent edition on June 27, 2010, also featured England's Prince Harry. In October 2010, Nacho Figueras co-hosted the Veuve Clicquot Polo Classic with Cameron Silver in Los Angeles at Will Rogers state park attracting celebrities and socialites like Minnie Driver, Mischa Barton, Donovan Leitch and Rachel Zoe. He appeared as himself in the 44th episode of the CW television series Gossip Girl, third-season premiere "Reversals of fortune", aired in 2009. On September 28, 2009, Figueras was a guest on The Oprah Winfrey Show in Chicago.  The show was titled "Meet the Most Famous People in the World". In one of the segments on the show, Nacho gave Oprah's reporter Ali Wentworth a private polo lesson. Nacho Figueras also makes frequent appearances in The Ellen DeGeneres Show TV show as he is a great friend of the host Ellen DeGeneres.

Personal life
Figueras has been married to fellow Argentine Delfina Blaquier, a photographer and former model, since 2004. The couple currently have four children, Hilario born in 2000, Aurora born in 2005, Artemio born in 2010 and Alba born in 2013.

Filmography

Film

Television

References

External links
Profile on World Polo Tour
BlackWatch Polo Team
Interview Magazine

1977 births
Living people
Sportspeople from Buenos Aires Province
Argentine polo players
Argentine male models